Horrido is a 1924 German silent film directed by Johannes Meyer and starring Robert Leffler, Rudolf Forster and Lia Eibenschütz.

The film's art direction was by Otto Erdmann and Hans Sohnle.

Cast
 Robert Leffler 
 Rudolf Forster 
 Lia Eibenschütz 
 Heinrich Schroth 
 Charlotte Ander 
 Viktor Schwannecke 
 Henry Bender 
 Carl Zickner 
 Georg Baselt 
 Paul Rehkopf 
 Jenny Nansen 
 Hermann Leffler

References

External links

1924 films
Films of the Weimar Republic
Films directed by Johannes Meyer
German silent feature films
German black-and-white films
Films about hunters
UFA GmbH films